Acanthoscelides is a genus of bean weevils of the subfamily Bruchinae. They are native to the New World. About one third of them can be found in Mexico.

In 1946 this genus was populated with at least 322 species transferred from other genera, mainly Bruchus. Some of these were later placed into other genera. Estimates of the current number of named species range from about 300 to 340, and there are over 200 undescribed species.

These beetles are generally 1.1 to 3.5 millimeters long. They have large, protruding eyes, and males often have larger eyes than females. They sometimes also have longer antennae. The elytra are about twice as long as they are wide. The beetles of this genus are diverse and the characters used to classify them are not well defined; historically, Acanthoscelides is a wastebasket taxon, "used as a genus into which species are placed that do not fit within the limits of other genera".

Most of these beetles feed on legumes. The majority specialize on Faboideae, many on Mimosoideae, and fewer on Caesalpinioideae. Some are known from non-legume host plants, such as mallows.

Familiar species include Acanthoscelides obtectus, a worldwide pest of beans, and Acanthoscelides macrophthalmus, which is employed as an agent of biological pest control against the invasive tree Leucaena leucocephala.

Species
Species include:
Acanthoscelides aequalis
Acanthoscelides alboscutellatus (Horn, 1873)
Acanthoscelides atomus
Acanthoscelides aureolus (Horn, 1873)
Acanthoscelides baboquivari
Acanthoscelides bisignatus
Acanthoscelides biustulus (Fall, 1910)
Acanthoscelides calvus (Horn, 1873)
Acanthoscelides chiricahuae (Fall, 1910)
Acanthoscelides compressicornis (Schaeffer, 1907)
Acanthoscelides comstocki
Acanthoscelides daleae
Acanthoscelides desmanthi
Acanthoscelides distinguendus
Acanthoscelides flavescens
Acanthoscelides floridae
Acanthoscelides fraterculus
Acanthoscelides fumatus
Acanthoscelides griseolus
Acanthoscelides helianthemum
Acanthoscelides herissantitus
Acanthoscelides inquisitus
Acanthoscelides kingsolveri
Acanthoscelides lobatus
Acanthoscelides longistilus
Acanthoscelides macrophthalmus
Acanthoscelides margaretae   
Acanthoscelides mixtus    
Acanthoscelides modestus    
Acanthoscelides mundulus    
Acanthoscelides napensis 
Acanthoscelides oblongoguttatus  
Acanthoscelides obrienorum   
Acanthoscelides obsoletus    
Acanthoscelides obtectus 
Acanthoscelides obvelatus
Acanthoscelides oregonensis 
Acanthoscelides pallidipennis 
Acanthoscelides pauperculus  
Acanthoscelides pectoralis  
Acanthoscelides pedicularius   
Acanthoscelides perforatus
Acanthoscelides prosopoides  
Acanthoscelides pullus   
Acanthoscelides pusillimus   
Acanthoscelides quadridentatus   
Acanthoscelides rufovittatus
Acanthoscelides sauli  
Acanthoscelides schaefferi   
Acanthoscelides schrankiae   
Acanthoscelides seminulum 
Acanthoscelides sousai 
Acanthoscelides speciosus    
Acanthoscelides stylifer    
Acanthoscelides subaequalis    
Acanthoscelides submuticus    
Acanthoscelides tenuis    
Acanthoscelides tridenticulatus

References

External links

Chrysomelidae genera
Bruchinae